The 2022 NASCAR Xfinity Series was the 41st season of the NASCAR Xfinity Series, a stock car racing series sanctioned by NASCAR in the United States. The season started with the Beef. It's What's for Dinner. 300 on February 19 at Daytona International Speedway and ended with the NASCAR Xfinity Series Championship Race on November 5 at Phoenix Raceway.

Daniel Hemric entered the season as the defending champion and attempted to become the second driver in series history to win back-to-back championships driving for two different teams. (The first was Tyler Reddick in 2018 and 2019, who drove for JR Motorsports and Richard Childress Racing in those years respectively.) Hemric drove the No. 18 car for Joe Gibbs Racing in 2021, but moved to the No. 11 car for Kaulig Racing in 2022. Hemric once again made the Playoffs but was eliminated after the Round of 12.

The Xfinity Series logo also changed from red to purple in 2022 to reflect a similar change in the logo of series title sponsor Xfinity.

Following the 2022 Food City 300 at Bristol, A. J. Allmendinger of Kaulig Racing clinched the regular season championship. After the 2022 Alsco Uniforms 302 at Las Vegas, Chevrolet won the manufacturers' championship. Ty Gibbs won the 2022 NASCAR Xfinity Series Championship, while Joe Gibbs Racing won its fourth championship. It was also JGR's second NXS Championship in a row. Austin Hill of Richard Childress Racing won the 2022 NASCAR Xfinity Series Rookie of the Year honors.

Teams and drivers

Complete schedule

Limited schedule

Notes

Changes

Teams
 On August 6, 2021, Shane Lee tweeted that he got the equipment from the closed H2 Motorsports team that he drove for in 2019 and was contemplating whether to use it and start his own team or sell the equipment. On November 18, Joey Gase announced that he would start his own team, Joey Gase Racing, fielding the No. 35 Ford/Toyota full-time in 2022 with himself and other drivers sharing the ride. The Toyotas that the team will run were the ones owned by Lee that were last used by H2M. As part of the deal to sell the equipment to Gase, Lee will drive select races in Gase's No. 35. On December 30, it was announced that Patrick Emerling (who drove part-time for Our Motorsports in 2020 and 2021) would join the team as a driver and a co-owner, and as a result, the team was renamed Emerling-Gase Motorsports, and that the team would also field a second part-time car.
 On August 21, 2021, it was announced that NFL Hall of Famer Emmitt Smith and driver Jesse Iwuji would be starting an Xfinity Series team, Jesse Iwuji Motorsports, with Iwuji running the full season and for Rookie of the Year. On February 7, 2022, it was announced that the team would run Chevrolets and share a shop with JD Motorsports, which had extra space available as they reduced from 4 full-time cars to 2 for 2022. The team chose the No. 34 in honor of fellow African American driver Wendell Scott after Team Penske, who cut back to a part-time Xfinity car in 2022, declined to give the team their first choice of car number, the No. 22, Smith's number when he played for the Dallas Cowboys.
 On August 30, 2021, it was announced that Caesar Bacarella, who has driven part-time in the series for B. J. McLeod Motorsports and DGM Racing since 2017, would be joining Martins Motorsports as a driver/co-owner and the team would be renamed Alpha Prime Racing (Alpha Prime is a company he owns). In addition to Bacarella, Tommy Joe Martins, Rajah Caruth, and potentially additional drivers will share the team's No. 44 car for the full season. On January 6, 2022, Alpha Prime Racing announced it will field two full-time teams in 2022, with Sage Karam driving the No. 45 for four races.
 When the Jayski's Silly Season Site 2022 Xfinity Series team/driver chart was released, it was revealed that Big Machine Racing, which fields the No. 48 car for Jade Buford (who will return to the team in 2022) may form an alliance with a larger NASCAR Xfinity Series team. On October 7, 2021, BMRT announced that they would partner with Richard Childress Racing in 2022.
 Miles Thomas Motorsports will debut in 2022. The team will compete part-time in both the Xfinity Series and ARCA Menards Series with Jason Miles, who is also a co-owner of the team. Miles competed part-time in ARCA for Fast Track Racing in 2019 and 2021. Ford will be their manufacturer. The team has yet to announce their car number, sponsors, and crew chief.
 On October 14, 2021, Bob Pockrass from Fox tweeted that Joe Gibbs Racing could downsize from four full-time cars to three in 2022. One of the cars would continue to be for a rotation of drivers like the No. 54 was in 2021. The team lost two of its full-time drivers from 2021, Daniel Hemric, who moved to Kaulig Racing's No. 11 car, and Harrison Burton, who moved up to Wood Brothers Racing in the NASCAR Cup Series, who each bring sponsorship, and the team could not find sponsorship for the No. 54 car in multiple races in 2021. On November 16, JGR officially announced that it would only field 3 full-time Xfinity Series cars in 2022, thus shutting down the No. 20 team, because the No. 54 car would return in 2022 with Ty Gibbs as its full-time driver. It was later turned out the No. 54 was renumbered from the No. 20 after the season ended.
 On October 28, 2021, it was announced that RSS Racing would field two full-time cars again in 2022 with multiple drivers sharing the second car (announced to be the No. 38 on January 17, 2022). After previously fielding three full-time cars in 2018 and 2019 and two in 2020, the team downsized to one car, the No. 39, in 2021. After two drivers of the No. 38, C. J. McLaughlin and Parker Retzlaff, were both announced to be running the race at Bristol in September, it appeared likely that RSS would field a third car in that race. On January 20, 2022, RSS announced that they would field a third car, the No. 28, for Kyle Sieg part-time in 2022.
 On October 29, 2021, it was announced that Richard Childress Racing would field two full-time cars again in 2022, with their second car driven by Austin Hill. On January 21, 2022, RCR revealed on their website that Hill's car number would be the No. 21, which the team has used in the Xfinity Series for many years.
 On November 17, 2021, MBM Motorsports owner Carl Long announced on SiriusXM NASCAR Radio that his team would downsize their Xfinity Series team to one full-time car in 2022. The team previously fielded three full-time cars, the Nos. 13, 61 and 66, with the No. 61 sharing the owner points with Hattori Racing Enterprises.
 On December 16, 2021, Our Motorsports announced that they would be expanding to three full-time cars in 2022. Jeb Burton will drive the team's new third car, the No. 27.
 On December 20, 2021, J. C. Stout (who drove part-time in the Xfinity Series from 2008 to 2010 and the Truck Series from 2003 to 2010) announced that he had bought some Toyotas from Joe Gibbs Racing and would be restarting his team, SQR Development (previously Stellar Quest Racing), which last competed in the series in 2009. The team planned to run 10 to 12 races with the first one being at Richmond. On January 20, 2022, SQR announced that former Kyle Busch Motorsports and GMS Racing Truck Series driver Raphaël Lessard would drive the team's car, the No. 87, part-time. Lessard and the No. 87 car were not on the entry list for the race at Richmond and Lessard revealed in a Facebook post on March 29 that the team would not be attempting any races due to personal issues involving team owner Stout.
 On January 13, 2022, Team Penske Vice Chairman Walt Czarnecki announced that Penske would not field an Xfinity Series team in 2022 unless a sponsor was interested. On February 15, 2022, Roger Penske revealed on SiriusXM NASCAR Radio that his team would field a part-time car in the Xfinity Series in 2022.
 On March 28, 2022, DGM Racing announced it would condense its Xfinity operation to two full-time teams with the No. 36 and No. 91 continuing to run full-time while the No. 92 would become a part-time car. A day later, SS-Green Light Racing announced that it purchased the points of the No. 92 car for its No. 08 car, which had failed to qualify for four of the first six races of the season.
 On April 12, 2022, Richard Childress Racing announced that they would be fielding a third part-time car, the No. 3, in the spring race at Talladega with Jeffrey Earnhardt driving. It is the first time since 2018 that RCR has fielded the No. 3 car in the Xfinity Series.
 On April 19, 2022, B. J. McLeod Motorsports announced that they would scale back to two full-time cars, the No. 5 and No. 78, for the remainder of 2022, with the No. 99, previously a full-time car, now being fielded on a part-time basis.
 On June 2, 2022, Hendrick Motorsports announced it would field the No. 17 in three Xfinity races in 2022, with Kyle Larson running at Road America, Alex Bowman at Indianapolis, and William Byron at Watkins Glen. This marks HMS' return to the Xfinity Series after Tony Stewart won for the team at Daytona in 2009.
 On June 27, 2022, Team Stange Racing revealed that they would field an entry in the Xfinity Series race at the Indianapolis Road Course in order for Tarso Marques, who is running part-time in the Cup Series for the team, to be approved to race in the Cup Series, although they would end up not appearing on the entry list.
 On August 8, 2022, it was revealed that Kaulig Racing would field a fourth car, the No. 14, for the first time in the race at Daytona which will be driven by Justin Haley, who drives full-time in the Cup Series for the team.

Drivers 
 On September 15, 2020, JR Motorsports announced that Sam Mayer would run full-time for them in 2022 after running the second half of the 2021 season in their No. 8 car. After the announcement that Josh Berry, who shared the No. 8 car with Mayer in 2021, would drive the No. 8 full-time in 2022, Dustin Albino from Jayski confirmed that Mayer would still run full-time for JRM in 2022. Dale Earnhardt Jr. himself commented on NASCAR Reddit that it was possible that the team could run five cars full-time so the team would not have to release one of their other full-time drivers. JRM had re-signed Noah Gragson and Justin Allgaier in addition to Berry and Mayer and it was likely that Michael Annett would return to the team in 2022 due to him bringing sponsorship from Pilot Flying J, so at that time, it was likely that Mayer would run full-time for JRM in the fifth car. However, with Annett announcing his retirement, Mayer will replace him as the team's fourth full-time driver and the team will not field a fifth car full-time. However, JRM will field a fifth car (the No. 88) in the spring Martinsville race for Earnhardt Jr. in his once-a-year Xfinity Series start. It is the first time since 2018 that JRM will have fielded five cars in a race. On December 15, JRM revealed a new font for the No. 1 on their website, which indicates that it will be Mayer's car number in 2022.
 On June 18, 2021, Kaulig Racing announced that Justin Haley, the driver of their No. 11 car in the Xfinity Series, would move up to the Cup Series full-time in 2022, driving the team's No. 31 car. On September 25, Kaulig announced that Daniel Hemric would replace Haley in the No. 11 in 2022. He drove the No. 18 for Joe Gibbs Racing in 2021 and won the championship. Hemric also drove Kaulig's No. 10 car in the race at Charlotte in 2019 as a relief driver for Austin Dillon.
 On July 15, 2021, Team Penske announced that Austin Cindric would move up to the Cup Series full-time in 2022, replacing Brad Keselowski (who is moving to RFK Racing to become a driver/co-owner for that team) in the No. 2 car. The team has yet to announce their plans for the No. 22 car, although at this time it appears most likely that it will go back to being an "all-star car" with their Cup Series drivers sharing the ride, according to Jordan Bianchi from The Athletic. 
 On July 15, 2021, it was also announced that Harrison Burton, the driver of the No. 20 for Joe Gibbs Racing in the Xfinity Series, would be moving up to the Cup Series full-time in 2022, replacing Matt DiBenedetto in the No. 21 car for Wood Brothers Racing. JGR has yet to announce who will replace Burton in the No. 20, although JGR part-time Xfinity and full-time ARCA driver Ty Gibbs and Kyle Busch Motorsports full-time Truck Series driver John Hunter Nemechek are widely considered to be the most likely candidates (although Nemechek would run part-time since he is returning to KBM in the Truck Series full-time in 2022). Gibbs could also stay in the No. 54, which he drove part-time in 2021, and run full-time in that car since Kyle Busch will not be returning to the Xfinity Series in 2022 after reaching his retirement goal of 100 wins in the series in 2021. Gibbs could also drive JGR's No. 18 car in 2022 as Daniel Hemric will be leaving the team to drive the No. 11 for Kaulig Racing in 2022.
 On July 16, 2021, GMS Racing full-time Truck Series driver Sheldon Creed stated in an interview that he would like to move up to the Xfinity Series full-time in 2022. On August 17, Chris Knight from Catchfence tweeted that Creed was close to getting a 2022 deal done. On September 14, it was announced that Creed would drive full-time for Richard Childress Racing in the Xfinity Series in 2022. On October 9, RCR announced that Creed would replace Myatt Snider in the No. 2 and that Snider would remain with RCR in their driver development program. On November 3, it was announced that Snider would drive full-time for the RCR-aligned Jordan Anderson Racing in their No. 31 car in 2022.
 On July 27, 2021, Tommy Joe Martins announced that he will go back to part-time as a driver and his team's No. 44 will be split between him and multiple other drivers, one of which currently competes in ARCA and has yet to make a start in the top 3 series. Martins is expected to announce who that driver is sometime in August. On August 30, Martins announced that the driver is Rajah Caruth, who will be running three races in the No. 44 car (one race at Martinsville, Dover, and Richmond) with the possibility of two more if sponsorship can be found (Pocono and Kansas). Caruth will also return to Rev Racing and the Drive for Diversity program in 2022 and will run full-time in the ARCA Menards Series.
 On August 16, 2021, JR Motorsports announced that Josh Berry would drive full-time in their No. 8 car in 2022, which he drove part-time in 2021.
 On September 9, 2021, it was announced that Colby Howard would drive full-time in the Truck Series for McAnally-Hilgemann Racing in 2022. He previously drove the No. 15 for JD Motorsports in the Xfinity Series full-time in 2021 and part-time in 2020.
 On September 21, 2021, it was announced that Stefan Parsons would drive full-time for B. J. McLeod Motorsports in 2022. He has driven part-time for the team since 2019, mostly in the No. 99 car. On April 19, 2022, BJMM announced that they would be cutting back to two full-time cars with the No. 99 car and Parsons being reduced to a part-time schedule.
 On October 2, 2021, Jamie Little revealed during the NASCAR on Fox pre-race show for the Truck Series race at Talladega that Austin Hill will not be returning to Hattori Racing Enterprises in 2022. Hill hopes to compete in the Xfinity Series full-time in 2022. He competed full-time in the Truck Series and part-time in the Xfinity Series for Hattori in 2019, 2020 and 2021. On October 29, it was announced that Hill would drive full-time for Richard Childress Racing in 2022.
 On October 6, 2021, it was announced that Michael Annett would retire from full-time competition after the 2021 season. He has driven full-time for JR Motorsports in the Xfinity Series since 2017.
 On October 11, 2021, Jeb Burton confirmed in an interview with Frontstretch that he would not be returning to the Kaulig Racing No. 10 in 2022 as a result of longtime sponsor Nutrien parting ways with the team at the end of the 2021 season. On December 9, Kaulig signed Landon Cassill to drive the No. 10 full-time in 2022.
 On October 15, 2021, Bayley Currey stated in an interview with Jayski's Silly Season Site that he hopes to return to JD Motorsports in 2022. He drove for Mike Harmon Racing for most of the 2021 season until he was taken out of the ride due to other drivers bringing sponsorship. On December 27, JDM announced that Currey would drive one of their cars full-time in 2022. Although he drove the No. 15 in all of his starts for the team in 2021, Currey moved to JDM's No. 4 car for 2022, replacing Landon Cassill.
 On October 19, 2021, B. J. McLeod Motorsports announced that Nick Sanchez would run part-time for the team in 2022. It will be his debut in the Xfinity Series. Sanchez, a member of the Drive for Diversity program, will also continue to drive full-time for Rev Racing in the ARCA Menards Series in 2022. Sanchez would replace Matt Mills in BJMM's No. 5 car in the races he ran. On July 15, 2022, Sanchez parted ways with B. J. McLeod Motorsports after running two of his seven races scheduled with the team. On September 8, Mills tweeted that he would miss the Kansas race due to a flu. Garrett Smithley was announced as the driver of the No. 5 for the race.
 On November 9, 2021, Jeffrey Earnhardt posted on his Facebook page that he would not return to JD Motorsports in 2022 in order to pursue opportunities to drive for a top-tier team whether it be full-time or part-time. On January 14, 2022, it was announced that Earnhardt would drive part-time in the No. 26 car for Sam Hunt Racing. On March 8, Emerling-Gase Motorsports announced that Earnhardt would drive their No. 35 car in the spring race at Phoenix. On April 12, it was announced that Earnhardt would drive for Richard Childress Racing in the spring race at Talladega in their No. 3 car, the number made famous by his grandfather Dale when he drove for RCR in the Cup Series.
 On November 15, 2021, DGM Racing announced that Josh Williams will not return to the No. 92, with the team opting to find an experienced and funded driver to fill the seat in 2022. On January 31, it was announced that Kyle Weatherman, who drove the No. 47 for Mike Harmon Racing full-time in 2021, would replace Williams in the No. 92, driving the first five races of the season in that car. Ross Chastain drove the No. 92 at COTA. After COTA, the No. 92's owner points were sold to the No. 08 SS-Green Light Racing car, primarily driven by David Starr.
 On November 22, 2021, NASCAR indefinitely suspended Alpha Prime Racing driver/co-owner Caesar Bacarella for substance abuse after he claimed he unknowingly took a workout supplement that is on the banned substances list. Bacarella enrolled in the Road to Recovery program with the expectation of being reinstated in time for the season-opener at Daytona. On February 14, 2022, Bacarella was reinstated by NASCAR.
 On December 1, 2021, JR Motorsports announced that Porsche Cup Brasil champion Miguel Paludo will return to the team for three road course races in 2022, although he will now drive the part-time No. 88 car as Josh Berry is driving the No. 8, which Paludo drove in 2021, full-time in 2022. On April 26, 2022, JR Motorsports announced that the No. 88 would be driven by Cup Series regulars Chase Elliott at Darlington spring, William Byron at Texas and New Hampshire, and Kyle Larson at Watkins Glen and Darlington fall.
 On December 3, 2021, RSS Racing announced that Parker Retzlaff, who has driven in the ARCA Menards Series East for Cook-Finley Racing, would run part-time in the team's full-time second car (later announced to be the No. 38) in 2022. With the race at Bristol in September overlapping with C. J. McLaughlin's schedule in the car, Retzlaff may drive the third RSS car, the No. 28, in that race or that race could be switched to another one.
 On December 8, 2021, B. J. McLeod Motorsports announced that Josh Williams would run full-time in the No. 78 for the team in 2022. Williams drove for DGM Racing the last five years either full-time or part-time. On August 10, Williams parted ways with B. J. McLeod Motorsports.
 On December 15, 2021, DGM Racing announced that Mason Massey would drive the No. 91 car for the majority of the 2022 season. He drove part-time for B. J. McLeod Motorsports in 2020 and 2021. A Jayski article on March 20, 2022, revealed that Massey would drive the car in all of the oval races. On May 25, 2022, DGM Racing announced that IMSA driver Mason Filippi would make his Xfinity Series and NASCAR debut in the race at Portland in the team's No. 91 car.
 On December 16, 2021, it was announced that Anthony Alfredo, previously the driver of the No. 38 for Front Row Motorsports in the Cup Series, and Jeb Burton, previously the driver of the Kaulig Racing No. 10, would both run full-time for Our Motorsports in 2022 as the team expands to three full-time cars. Alfredo will drive the No. 23, which multiple drivers drove part-time in 2021, and Burton will drive the team's new third car, the No. 27.
 On January 7, 2022, Mike Harmon Racing announced that it has parted ways with Kyle Weatherman. On January 31, it was announced that Weatherman would drive the No. 92 for DGM Racing in the first five races of the season. On February 10, it was announced that Gray Gaulding, who drove MHR's No. 74 car at the Charlotte Roval in 2020 and 2021 and at Kansas in October 2021, would drive the No. 47 in the season-opener at Daytona and Talladega. Brennan Poole would compete in their No. 47 for a handful of races.
 On January 8, 2022, SS-Green Light Racing announced that Joe Graf Jr. would run full-time in the No. 07 while the second team would have Cole Custer running at least four races and Chase Briscoe running one race in 2022. Custer would end up driving the No. 07 in his first start with the team at California with Graf Jr. moving to the No. 08. On October 4, Truck Series driver Hailie Deegan announced she would make her Xfinity Series debut in the No. 07 at Las Vegas.
 On January 13, 2022, Sam Hunt Racing announced that Ryan Truex would run part-time in the No. 26 in 2022. Truex previously drove full-time in the Truck Series in the No. 40 for Niece Motorsports, but lost his ride in that truck to Dean Thompson for 2022. On February 24, it was announced that Truex would also run 4 races for Joe Gibbs Racing in their No. 18 car. He drove part-time for JGR in the Xfinity Series in 2011 and 2012.
 On January 17, 2022, it was announced that C. J. McLaughlin would return to RSS Racing to drive their No. 38 car in 14 races in 2022. He drove part-time for RSS in 2019 and 2020. McLaughlin would end up driving 1 of his races (Las Vegas in March) in the team's No. 28 car instead of the No. 38. 
 On January 20, 2022, SQR Development announced that former Kyle Busch Motorsports and GMS Racing Truck Series driver Raphaël Lessard would drive the team's car, the No. 87, part-time. Lessard and the No. 87 car were not on the entry list for the team's scheduled first race at Richmond and Lessard revealed in a Facebook post on March 29 that the team would not be attempting any races due to personal issues involving team owner Stout.
 On February 12, 2022, DGM Racing announced that Alex Labbé, who drove their No. 36 car full-time in 2021, would only be driving for the team part-time in 2022 due to lack of sponsorship. He drove the team's part-time fourth car, the No. 90, in the season-opener at Daytona. He would then drive for the team in the races at Phoenix in March and COTA (in the No. 36), Road America, the Indy Road Course, Michigan, Daytona in August, Bristol and the Charlotte Roval. However, Labbé would end up also running every race after Daytona until Charlotte in May in the No. 36 car. On May 24, DGM announced that Labbé would not be running the race at Charlotte due to the inability to find a sponsor but would return to the No. 36 car for the race at Portland. Austin Konenski from Sportsnaut revealed that Garrett Smithley would be driving the No. 36 car at Charlotte.
 On February 16, 2022, MBM Motorsports announced that J. J. Yeley would drive their No. 66 car in the season-opener at Daytona. Yeley also told Bob Pockrass from Fox that it was possible that he would run the full season in the car.
 On February 21, 2022, it was revealed that ARCA Menards Series West driver Takuma Koga would attempt to make his Xfinity Series debut in the No. 13 car for MBM sometime in 2022.
 On March 9, 2022, Sam Hunt Racing announced that Parker Chase would make his Xfinity Series debut in the race at Circuit of the Americas driving their No. 26 car. Chase has competed part-time in the ARCA Menards Series for Venturini Motorsports and made his Truck Series debut at the Daytona Road Course in 2021 in the Kyle Busch Motorsports No. 51. Chase returned to the No. 26 car at Portland.
 On March 10, 2022, it was announced that road course ringer Patrick Gallagher would drive the RSS Racing No. 38 car in the race at Circuit of the Americas. Gallagher ended up driving the No. 28 RSS car instead of the No. 38. It was his second Xfinity Series start as he made his series debut in 2019 in the race at Mid-Ohio in the B. J. McLeod Motorsports No. 99 car.
 On April 12, 2022, Big Machine Racing announced that Kaz Grala would replace Jade Buford in the team's No. 48 car for the races at Talladega and Dover in April in order to evaluate the team's performance and see if they can get better finishes. At that point in the season, Buford and the No. 48 car had only scored one top-20 finish (eighth at COTA). Tyler Reddick replaced him at Darlington and Texas and Austin Dillon replaced him at Charlotte. Buford returned to the No. 48 car at Portland. On August 7, BMR announced that IndyCar Series driver Marco Andretti would make his NASCAR debut at the Charlotte Roval.
 On May 25, 2022, Joe Gibbs Racing announced that Connor Mosack, who competes full-time in the Trans-Am Series for TeamSLR and part-time in the ARCA Menards Series for Bret Holmes Racing, would make his Xfinity Series debut in their No. 18 car in the race at Portland.
 On May 30, 2022, it was announced that road course ringer Darren Dilley, who has driven in the ICSCC and Sports Car Club of America, would make his Xfinity Series debut in RSS Racing's No. 38 car in the race at Portland.
 On the Portland entry list,  Gray Gaulding and Ryan Vargas are revealed to have switched rides, meaning Gaulding would be in the No. 6 and Vargas would be in the No. 47.
 On July 22, 2022, Brandon Brown announced he would drive the Mike Harmon Racing No. 47 at Indianapolis while Austin Dillon would drive the No. 68 of Brandonbilt Motorsports due to a lack of funding on the latter team. Brown later stated that he would unlikely return to the No. 68 full-time as a result of his struggle to secure a sponsor. Kris Wright was announced to drive the No. 68 in all but three races from August onwards. Brown drove the No. 5 for B. J. McLeod Motorsports at Watkins Glen.
 On August 22, 2022, it was announced that Josh Williams would return to DGM Racing starting at the Daytona, with him driving the rest of the season split between the team's No. 36 and No. 92 cars. He will drive the No. 36 car in each race that Alex Labbé does not have sponsorship for (all remaining races except Daytona, Bristol and the Charlotte Roval, where he'll be sponsored by Can-Am). In those three races, Williams will drive the No. 92 car.
 On August 23, 2022, Big Machine Racing owner Scott Borchetta revealed on SiriusXM NASCAR Radio that Ross Chastain would drive his team's No. 48 car in a "couple" of races in 2022. With Ricky Stenhouse Jr. driving the car at Daytona and Nick Sanchez driving the car at Bristol and that "couple" meant more than one race, Chastain will more than likely drive the car at both Darlington and Kansas. (All races after Bristol are playoff races which Cup Series drivers are not allowed to run.)
 On August 29, 2022, Dawson Cram announced that he would join Emerling-Gase Motorsports in their No. 35 Ford with sponsorship from Be Water and in a partnership with Cram Racing Enterprises.

Crew chiefs
 On November 5, 2021, it was reported by Jayski that Dave Elenz would not return as crew chief for Noah Gragson and would move to the NASCAR Cup Series to be the crew chief for the Richard Petty Motorsports No. 43 car of Erik Jones, replacing Jerry Baxter. The move was officially announced on November 10. Noah Gragson's new crew chief will be announced at a later date. On January 4, JRM announced that former Roush Fenway Racing Cup Series crew chief Luke Lambert would replace Elenz as the crew chief for the No. 9 of Gragson.
 On November 10, 2021, Sam Hunt Racing announced that Allen Hart, who previously worked for JR Motorsports as the engineer for Justin Allgaier's No. 7 car (as well as Allgaier's interim crew chief in one race in 2021), would become the team's technical director as well as the crew chief for their No. 26 car. Former crew chief Andrew Abbott will remain with Sam Hunt Racing in another role.
 On November 16, 2021, it was announced that defending Xfinity Series championship-winning crew chief Dave Rogers, who was Daniel Hemric's crew chief at Joe Gibbs Racing in 2021, would be moving to 23XI Racing in the Cup Series as their performance director in 2022.
 On November 22, 2021, NASCAR suspended Mike Harmon Racing crew chief Ryan Bell for the first six races in 2022 for violating the vehicle testing rule when the team brought the No. 74 car to Rockingham Speedway (which is currently unsanctioned by NASCAR) for a charity event. In addition, the team will have 75 owner and driver points deducted at the start of the 2022 season. On January 27, 2022, Mike Harmon Racing won its final appeal, rescinding Bell's suspension and the monetary fine while still receiving the points deduction. Bell would move from the MHR No. 74 car to the No. 47 car in 2022, replacing Mike Tyska, who became the crew chief for Stefan Parsons and the No. 99 B. J. McLeod Motorsports car.
 On December 8, 2021, B. J. McLeod Motorsports announced that Danny Johnson would be the crew chief for Josh Williams and their No. 78 car in 2022. Johnson crew chiefed the No. 23 Our Motorsports car for most of the first half of the 2021 season. He was also Williams' crew chief when he ran full-time in the ARCA Menards Series in 2016 for his own team.
 On December 16, 2021, Our Motorsports announced their 2022 crew chief lineup. Pat Tryson, who was the crew chief for Brett Moffitt and the No. 02 car for the second half of 2021, will replace Kenneth Roettger Jr. as crew chief of the No. 23, which will now be driven by Anthony Alfredo. Former GMS Racing Truck Series crew chiefs Jeff Hensley and Chad Walter were announced as the crew chiefs for the No. 02 of Moffitt and the new No. 27 car of Jeb Burton, respectively. However, on February 3, it was announced that Hensley would instead be the new crew chief for Matt Crafton's No. 88 truck for ThorSport Racing in the Truck Series. Former East and West Series crew chief and Joe Gibbs Racing crew member Kris Bowen would be the new crew chief for Moffitt and the Our Motorsports No. 02.
 On January 4, 2022, JR Motorsports announced that crew chiefs Mike Bumgarner and Taylor Moyer would switch cars for 2022, with Bumgarner moving from the No. 1 to the No. 8 and Moyer moving from the No. 8 to the No. 1.
 On January 8, 2022, Kaulig Racing announced that crew chiefs Bruce Schlicker and Jason Trinchere would switch cars for 2022, with Schlicker moving from the No. 10 to the No. 16 and Trinchere moving from the No. 16 to the No. 10. On September 9, it was announced that Trinchere would move to Kaulig's No. 11 car, driven by Daniel Hemric, switching cars with Alex Yontz, who became the crew chief for Kaulig's No. 10 car driven by Landon Cassill.
 On February 7, 2022, Jesse Iwuji Motorsports announced that former Rick Ware Racing Cup Series crew chief Jason Houghtaling would be the crew chief of the team's new No. 34 car. Before the race at Talladega in April, Houghtaling was released from the team due to a "multitude of issues" (and would later be suspended by NASCAR on May 3). He was replaced by Dan Stillman, who started the season as the crew chief of the Alpha Prime Racing No. 44 car.
 On April 17, 2022, it was announced that NASCAR on Fox analyst Larry McReynolds would return to crew chiefing for the first time since 2000 as he would serve as the crew chief for Jeffrey Earnhardt and the Richard Childress Racing No. 3 car in the race at Talladega in April.

Interim crew chiefs
 On October 26, 2021, NASCAR suspended Our Motorsports No. 23 crew chief Kenneth Roettger Jr. for 4 Xfinity Series races after the car lost a ballast during the race at Kansas that month. Because there were only 2 races left in the 2021 season, he will also be suspended for the first 2 races of the 2022 season (Daytona and California). Roettger Jr. will not return to Our Motorsports as a crew chief in 2022 (he was replaced by Pat Tryson, who moved over from the team's No. 02 car), but he will be suspended for whichever team he works for in 2022.
 On December 3, 2021, NASCAR announced that MBM Motorsports crew chief Johnny Roten has been indefinitely suspended after violating the substance abuse policy in the NASCAR rulebook. MBM has yet to announce if Roten will return to the team as a crew chief in 2022 after his suspension is lifted.
 On April 12, 2022, Jeff Stankiewicz, crew chief of the Richard Childress Racing No. 2 driven by Sheldon Creed, was suspended for four races after the car lost a ballast during the 2022 Call 811 Before You Dig 250 at Martinsville Speedway. James Pohlman would serve as the interim crew chief for Creed at Talladega, Dover, Darlington and Texas.
 On May 3, 2022, Taylor Moyer, crew chief of the JR Motorsports No. 1 driven by Sam Mayer, was suspended for four races due to a tire and wheel loss during the 2022 A-GAME 200 at Dover. Andrew Overstreet would serve as the interim crew chief for Mayer at Darlington, Texas, Charlotte and Portland.
 On May 31, 2022, Kase Kallenbach, crew chief of the JD Motorsports No. 6 driven by Ryan Vargas and Gray Gaulding, was suspended indefinitely for violating Section 4.4.e, which deals with NASCAR Member Code of Conduct Penalty Options and Guidelines. He was replaced by Alex Bird at Charlotte.
 On October 18, 2022, Mark Setzer, crew chief of the Jeremy Clements Racing No. 51 driven by Jeremy Clements, was suspended for one race and fined 25,000 for an L1 Penalty under Section 14.4.B.E, which deals with the modification of a composite body part following the 2022 Alsco Uniforms 302 at Las Vegas. In addition, the No. 51 has been docked 40 driver and owner points. Jeremy's father, Tony Clements, would serve as the interim crew chief at Homestead-Miami.

Manufacturers
 On October 28, 2021, it was announced that RSS Racing would have a technical alliance with Stewart-Haas Racing in 2022. The team switched to Ford in 2021 and the team received old SHR cars although they did not have a technical alliance with them.
 On January 7, 2022, SS-Green Light Racing announced a technical alliance with Stewart-Haas Racing and therefore would switch from Chevrolet to Ford in 2022. In 2021, the team's No. 17 car, fielded in a collaboration with Rick Ware Racing, was a Ford in five races instead of a Chevrolet.
 On January 16, 2022, Carl Long revealed on SiriusXM NASCAR Radio that in the season-opener at Daytona, his No. 66 MBM Motorsports car driven by Timmy Hill would be a Chevrolet. The car is a former Cup Series Gen-6 car that JTG Daugherty Racing used in 2021 converted into an Xfinity Series car. J. J. Yeley would end up driving the car in that race instead of Hill.

Sponsorship
 On August 19, 2021, JR Motorsports announced that Harrison's Workwear will be a primary sponsor for Josh Berry's No. 8 car in eight races in 2022. They join returning sponsor Tire Pros (which will sponsor Berry in nine races in 2022), which means that the car is sponsored for half the races.
 On September 17, 2021, it was reported and later confirmed by Kaulig Racing President Chris Rice that Nutrien Agricultural Solutions would not return to sponsoring the team in 2022, which leaves the No. 10 car without a primary sponsor. If Kaulig does not find a replacement sponsor, the No. 10 car might close down or not run full-time which would leave Kaulig with two full-time Xfinity Series cars in 2022. On December 9, cryptocurrency platform Voyager signed a two-year sponsorship deal with Landon Cassill and the Kaulig Racing No. 10. Cassill will be fully paid in a portfolio of multiple cryptocurrencies as part of the deal. On July 14, 2022, Voyager filed for Chapter 11 bankruptcy following a steep decline in cryptocurrency values.
 On October 9, 2021, Richard Childress Racing announced that Whelen Engineering Company would be the sponsor for Sheldon Creed and their No. 2 car for the full season in 2022. Whelen is the title sponsor of the NASCAR Whelen Modified Tour and the NASCAR Whelen Euro Series and also sponsored RCR's No. 31 Cup Series car, then driven by Ryan Newman, in two races in 2016.
 On October 20, 2021, it was announced that Menards would continue to be the pirmary sponsor of Brandon Jones and the Joe Gibbs Racing No. 19 car. However, Menards will now sponsor him for all 33 races after previously sponsoring a majority of the races but not all of them.
 On December 1, 2021, JR Motorsports announced that Brandt, which is the primary sponsor of their No. 7 car driven by Justin Allgaier, would continue to also sponsor Miguel Paludo in his three races with the team. The company will feature their operations on Brazil, BRANDT do Brasil, on Paludo's No. 88 car.
 On December 3, 2021, it was announced that Parker Retzlaff would be sponsored by Ponsse, Eco-Tracks and Iron Horse Loggers in his 10 races in the second RSS Racing car. Those sponsors also sponsored him in the ARCA Menards Series East with Cook-Finley Racing in 2020 and 2021.
 On December 13, 2021, Jesse Iwuji Motorsports announced that Equity Prime Mortgage will sponsor the team for eight races in 2022.
 On December 30, 2021, Brandonbilt Motorsports announced that cryptocurrency brand LGBcoin would be sponsoring the team's No. 68 car full-time in 2022. However, on January 5, 2022, NASCAR announced that it would be rejecting the sponsorship. As a result, the company would instead sign a personal services deal with Brown. On March 8, Zero FG energy drink was announced as the sponsor of the No. 68 at the Nalley Cars 250 at  Atlanta.
 On January 7, 2022, it was announced that UNITS Moving and Portable Storage would sponsor Timmy Hill and the No. 66 car for MBM Motorsports in multiple races. The company was previously a sponsor for the closed StarCom Racing team in the Cup Series. With J. J. Yeley now likely driving the No. 66 full-time, Hill would likely make these planned starts with UNITS sponsorship in MBM's No. 13 car.
 On January 7, 2022, it was announced that Pilot Flying J would not return to sponsor the JR Motorsports No. 1 car in 2022. The company was the longtime sponsor of Michael Annett and the car will now be driven by Sam Mayer after Annett retired.
 On January 17, 2022, it was announced that SciAps would sponsor the RSS Racing No. 38 car in the 14 races that C. J. McLaughlin will drive the car. The company has sponsored McLaughlin in nearly all races he has run in the Xfinity, Truck and ARCA Series.
 On January 20, 2022, Alpha Prime Racing announced that Heartbeat Hot Sauce would sponsor Ryan Ellis and their No. 45 car at Talladega in April. On January 25, the team announced that Market Rebellion would sponsor their No. 44 car at Daytona in February, both Texas races, and Las Vegas in October with Tommy Joe Martins driving as well as at Phoenix in November with Rajah Caruth driving. The company will also sponsor Sage Karam at COTA and the Indianapolis Road Course in the No. 45 car. On August 10, Sargento Foods announced it would sponsor the No. 45 driven by Josh Bilicki at Watkins Glen. This sponsorship deal came after Bilicki collided with and dragged a Sargento billboard at Road America.
 On January 24, 2022, Emerling-Gase Motorsports announced that sports-based cryptocurrency Kitty Kat Coin would sponsor the team's Nos. 35 and No. 53 cars in the season-opener at Daytona as well as other races throughout the season.
 On March 8, 2022, JD Motorsports announced that Swedish heavy metal band Ghost would be the primary sponsor and NASCAR YouTuber Eric Estepp's show Out of the Groove would be the associate sponsor of the No. 4 at the United Rentals 200 at Phoenix.
 On November 1, 2022, JD Motorsports announced that Out of the Groove would be the primary sponsor of the No. 6 driven by Brennan Poole at the 2022 NASCAR Xfinity Series Championship Race at Phoenix.

Rule changes
 On November 19, 2021, NASCAR announced the new practice and qualifying formats across all three national series in 2022. The formats are as follows:
 Oval races: After a 20-minute practice period for each of two groups, all cars will run a single qualifying lap (two laps at tracks 1.000 miles or shorter).  Top five in each group will advance to the final round, which is one or two qualifying laps.
 Superspeedway races: No practice period.  All cars run one lap each, with the top 10 transferring to the final round.
 Road courses: After a 20-minute practice period, the field will be separated into two groups, each running a 15-minute timed session. The top five of each group will advance to the final round, which consists of a 10-minute timed session.
 Daytona race 1, Atlanta race 1, Portland, Nashville, and the Phoenix season ending race will have one 50-minute practice session.
 On January 31, 2022, NASCAR announced that the Xfinity Series field size would be expanded to 38 cars, with 33 cars qualifying based on speed and five provisionals.
 On March 11, 2022, NASCAR announced that the reconfigured Atlanta Motor Speedway will enforce track limits currently implemented on Daytona International Speedway and Talladega Superspeedway.
 The Portland race will use the pit lane restrictions for stand-alone races.

Schedule

The 2022 season schedule was announced on September 29, 2021.

Note: Race names and title sponsors are subject to change. Not all title sponsors/names of races have been announced for 2022. For the races where a 2022 name and title sponsor has yet to be announced, the names of those races in 2021 are listed.

Schedule changes

 Auto Club Speedway returns to the schedule for the first time in two years as a result of state COVID-19 regulations in California forcing the cancellation of the 2021 race. It is scheduled for the weekend after the Daytona 500 (February 25, 26, and 27), which would make it the second race of the season for the first time since 2010, replacing the Daytona Road Course. This will also be the last race at the track before its proposed reconfiguration into a short track for 2023 (which has yet to be approved).
 The major venue change is a swap of Green Savoree Racing Promotions circuits. Mid-Ohio Sports Car Course will lose its date, which will go to Portland International Raceway, which in return Mid-Ohio will be awarded a Camping World Truck Series date. Portland will be the only standalone date for the Xfinity Series in 2022.
 As for other slight realignments, Richmond will go from the late-summer date to the spring date and Homestead-Miami go from February to late-October, returning to the playoffs.

Results and standings

Race results

Drivers' championship

(key) Bold – Pole position awarded by time. Italics – Pole position set by final practice results or owner's points. * – Most laps led. 1 – Stage 1 winner. 2 – Stage 2 winner 1–10 – Regular season top 10 finishers.
. – Eliminated after Round of 12
. – Eliminated after Round of 8

Owners' championship (Top 15)
(key) Bold – Pole position awarded by time. Italics – Pole position set by final practice results or owner's points. * – Most laps led. 1 – Stage 1 winner. 2 – Stage 2 winner 1–10 – Regular season top 10 finishers.
. – Eliminated after Round of 12
. – Eliminated after Round of 8

Manufacturers' championship

See also
 2022 NASCAR Cup Series
 2022 NASCAR Camping World Truck Series
 2022 ARCA Menards Series
 2022 ARCA Menards Series East
 2022 ARCA Menards Series West
 2022 NASCAR Whelen Modified Tour
 2022 NASCAR Pinty's Series
 2022 NASCAR Mexico Series
 2022 NASCAR Whelen Euro Series
 2022 SRX Series

References

NASCAR Xfinity Series seasons
NASCAR Xfinity
NASCAR Xfinity